This is a comparison between 401(k), Roth 401(k), and Traditional Individual Retirement Account and Roth Individual Retirement Account accounts, four different types of retirement savings vehicles that are common in the United States.

Comparison

See also
Retirement plans in the United States
Individual retirement account

References

External links
"Roth vs. Traditional IRA Calculator". BankSite.com. The Forms Group.
"401(k) vs Roth IRA". TheUsefulInfo.com.
Thomas, Kaye A. "Decision factors". Tax Guide for Investors. Fairmark Press Inc.
"401(k) Plans: FAQs". Retirement Dictionary. Appleby Retirement Consulting Inc.

Individual retirement accounts